Thomas Clayton (1 December 1882 – 24 March 1909) was an Australian jockey of the early 20th century.

Early life
Clayton was born in St Leonards, New South Wales, a Sydney harbourside suburb on the north shore, to James Clayton and Alice (née Russell).

Career
He was indentured to famous Randwick trainer Isaac Earnshaw and rode for him some of the best horses of the time. He was best known for his association with the champion Poseidon and accumulated an impressive record of major wins with this horse. Thanks to Poseidon, Clayton became the first jockey to win the Caulfield Cup-Melbourne Cup double in 1906. When Poseidon won the Caulfield Cup for a second time in 1907, Clayton became the first jockey to win consecutive Caulfield Cups.

Melbourne and Caulfield Cups
Before teaming up with Poseidon, Clayton went close to winning the Cups double with Acrasia in 1904.  Acrasia finished second in the Caulfield Cup, but went on to win the Melbourne Cup two weeks later. Courtesy of Warroo, Clayton achieved another second placing in the 1905 Caulfield Cup.  Another of Clayton's major wins came in the 1908 Futurity Stakes on Antonio.

Death
At 28 years of age, Clayton sustained a compound fracture of the pelvis, broken ribs and internal injuries when his mount "All Blue" was one of twelve horses to fall during the running of the Trial Stakes at Rosehill on 20 March 1909. He died as a result of these injuries on 24 March 1909.

Legacy
On 24 March 2004 the presentation whips Clayton was given for his Melbourne Cup wins on Acrasia and Poseidon were sold at Public Auction in Victoria. The Acrasia whip was sold for $750 and the Poseidon whip was sold for $3,750 (figures in Australian dollars). After Tom's death, these whips had been passed in succession to his wife, Nellie, his daughter, Nellie Mary, and then his grandson.

References

Sources
Tom Clayton profile on Melbourne Cup Club website
Futurity Stakes
Melbourne Cup Previous Winners

Australian jockeys
Jockeys who died while racing
Sport deaths in Australia
Accidental deaths in New South Wales
Sportsmen from New South Wales
1882 births
1909 deaths